A Connoisseur's Case is a 1962 detective novel by the British writer Michael Innes. It is the eighteenth in his series featuring John Appleby of Scotland Yard. It is a country house mystery, harking back to the Golden Age of Detective Fiction. It was released in the United States by Dodd, Mead under the alternative title The Crabtree Affair.

References

Bibliography
 Hubin, Allen J. Crime Fiction, 1749-1980: A Comprehensive Bibliography. Garland Publishing, 1984.
 Reilly, John M. Twentieth Century Crime & Mystery Writers. Springer, 2015.
 Scheper, George L. Michael Innes. Ungar, 1986.

1962 British novels
British mystery novels
British crime novels
Novels by Michael Innes
Novels set in England
British detective novels
Victor Gollancz Ltd books